Warner is a town in Muskogee County, Oklahoma, United States. The population was 1,641 at the 2010 census, an increase of 14.8 percent over the figure of 1,430 recorded in 2000. The town is home to one of the two Connors State College campuses.

History
The present town of Warner was formed from two communities, Bennett and Hereford, that formerly existed in the southern part of the Cherokee Nation's Canadian District. Hereford was located on the site of present-day Warner. It was established in 1903 and renamed Warner in 1905.

The Muskogee Southern Railroad (quickly acquired by the Midland Valley Railroad) built through town in the 1902-1903 timeframe.  The town briefly became a connection point when it got another rail line to Webbers Falls, Oklahoma in 1911, this one courtesy of the Webbers Falls, Shawnee and Western Railroad.   But that railway ceased operations in 1914, was reorganized as the Webbers Falls Railroad in 1916, and was dismantled by 1918.

Connors State Agricultural College was founded in Warner in 1908. A second campus in Muskogee was added later. The school was renamed Connors State College in 2001. It is now the town's largest employer.

Geography
Warner is located at  (35.494085, -95.308179).

Demographics

As of the census of 2000, there were 1,430 people, 509 households, and 344 families residing in the town. There were 636 housing units at an average density of 501.7 per square mile (193.4/km2). The racial makeup of the town was 65.31% White, 3.99% African American, 24.06% Native American, 0.77% from other races, and 5.87% from two or more races. Hispanic or Latino of any race were 2.38% of the population.

There were 509 households, out of which 31.2% had children under the age of 18 living with them, 52.5% were married couples living together, 12.6% had a female householder with no husband present, and 32.4% were non-families. 27.1% of all households were made up of individuals, and 11.0% had someone living alone who was 65 years of age or older. The average household size was 2.45 and the average family size was 2.99.

In the town, the population was spread out, with 23.0% under the age of 18, 24.8% from 18 to 24, 22.2% from 25 to 44, 17.4% from 45 to 64, and 12.6% who were 65 years of age or older. The median age was 27 years. For every 100 females, there were 96.4 males. For every 100 females age 18 and over, there were 91.5 males.

The median income for a household in the town was $22,500, and the median income for a family was $27,596. Males had a median income of $24,479 versus $14,960 for females. The per capita income for the town was $10,696. About 20.0% of families and 25.3% of the population were below the poverty line, including 42.1% of those under age 18 and 19.2% of those age 65 or over.

See also

 List of municipalities in Oklahoma

Notes

References

External links

Towns in Muskogee County, Oklahoma
Towns in Oklahoma